Sergey Chilikov (born 1953 in Kilemary, Mari ASSR; died June 21, 2020, Yoshkar-Ola, Republic of Mari El) is a Russian photographer.

Chilikov graduated from the philosophical faculty with a Ph.D. Until 1991, he had been teaching in the universities of Yoshkar-Ola. In 1993, he published his first book on analytical philosophy titled “Artseg. The Owner of a Thing or Ontology of Subjectiveness”.

Chilikov started as a photographer in 1976 in the creative group “The Fact” (Chilikov, Mikhailov, Evlampiev, Likhosherst, Voetskiy). From 1980 to 1989, he had been running “Analytical exhibitions of Photography” and the annual open-air photography festival on Kundysh river. In 1988, Chilikov took part in the retrospective exhibitions of the “Fact” Group in Moscow titled “On the Kashirka”. Since 1989, he photographed the journey over Soviet Union cities and towns.

Recently he has exhibited his photographic essays “Photo Provocations”, “The Countryside Glam”, “The Beach”, “The Gambling”, “The Philosophy of a Journey” and others at “Fashion and Style in Photography” and “Photobiennale” in Moscow, and "Les Rencontres d'Arles" in France (2002).

Chilikov lived in Yoshkar-Ola and in Moscow.

Died June 21, 2020.

Gulag Orkestar album art
A Chilikov photograph was used without his approval on the front and back of indie folk band Beirut's 2006 album Gulag Orkestar. According to Zach Condon, singer-songwriter of Beirut, the photographs were found in a book, torn out, in a library in Leipzig, Germany.

Exhibitions
Provincia russa, Musei Capitolini - Centrale Montemartini, Rome, Italy, 2003
La province russe, Fnac Saint-Lazare, Paris, France, 2003
Old Samara, Moscow House of Photography, Moscow, Russia 2004
The Beach, Moscow House of Photography, Moscow, Russia, 2004
La province russe dans les années 90''', Galeries des magasins Fnac, Gent, Belgium, 2004Gamble, XL Gallery, Moscow, Russia, 2005Selected Works 1978-'', Third Floor Gallery, Cardiff, Wales, 2011

References

External links
Gallery at Photographer.ru
Sergueï Tchilikov

1953 births
2020 deaths
People from Mari El
Soviet photographers
Russian photographers
Russian contemporary artists
Kandinsky Prize